William Howard Shuster Jr. (1893–1969), better known as Will Shuster, was an American painter, sculptor and teacher.

Early life 

Shuster was born November 26, 1893, in Philadelphia, Pennsylvania, as the second of three children.

Career 

He served in the U.S. Army during World War I in France, where he developed tuberculosis after being gassed. 

In 1920, Shuster moved to New Mexico in 1920 to improve his health, and became friends with the small but growing arts community.

In 1921, he became a members of Los Cinco Pintores ("the five painters"), and showed throughout Santa Fe and the rest of the country as a group. In 1924 Shuster built and burned the first ever Zozobra, a giant puppet now burned every year in effigy, and symbolizing the gloom of the passing year. In addition to painting, Shuster received a disability pension and made money doing ironwork. In 1952, he created El Toro, a symbol for the Santa Fe Rodeo.

His artwork is in the permanent collections of the Stark Museum of Art, Brooklyn Museum, Delaware Art Museum, Newark Museum, and New Mexico Museum of Art.

 undated — Senator Bronson Cutting (bronze bust)
 undated — Avanyu 1
 undated — Avanyu 2
 undated — Prayer for the Hunt
 undated — Portrait of Teresa Bakos
 undated — 40th Wedding Anniversary
 October 1922 — The Eve of Saint Francis
 1927 — New Mexico Mountain Scene
 1928 — Portrait of John Sloan
 1929 —The Santo Domingo - Corn Dance
  — Trees at Canyoncito
  — Eagle Dancer (study for The Voice of the Sky)
 1934 — Winnowing Wheat
 May 28 - August 8, 1934 — The Voice of the Earth (The Basket Dance)
 1934 — Pottery Maker
 May 28 - August 28, 1934 — The Voice of the Water (The Spring Flute Ceremony)
 1934 — Sermon at Cross of the Martyrs
 1935 — The Voice of Sipapu (The Kiva)
  — Sketchbook
 September 14 - October 12, 1943 — The Voice of the Sky (The Eagle Dance)
 1964 — Zozobra Mural

Notes and references

External links 

 Will Shuster at New Mexico Museum of Art

1893 births
1969 deaths
20th-century American male artists
20th-century American painters
artists from Santa Fe, New Mexico
Drexel University alumni
Federal Art Project artists
Public Works of Art Project artists
United States Army personnel of World War I